Samuel Garcia may refer to:
Samuel Garcia (footballer, born 1975), Tahitian footballer
Samu García (born 1990), Spanish footballer
Samuel García (politician) (born 1987), Governor of Nuevo León
Samuel García (sprinter) (born 1991), Spanish athlete